Ian Keith Harris (born 24 June 1935) is a composer of classical music, arranger, oboist and music educator from Australia.

Biography
Ian Keith Harris was born in Melbourne, living there for the first 26 years of his life. He started the piano at the age of five, was playing cornet in his school band, then violin for a couple of years at high school, and later was school pianist. in 1952, he began his Bachelor of Music degree at Melbourne University Conservatorium of Music taking piano as chief study and oboe as second. Later he changed to oboe as his chief study and studied composition with Arthur Nickson. he was soon in demand as a free-lance orchestral musician, arranger and copyist, working in a very eclectic mix of musical spheres from arranging for Eartha Kitt (television and various theatrical shows), to playing in opera, ballet, chamber music and symphony orchestras. He was a founding member of the Glendenian Trio, (flute, oboe, bassoon), which gave regular broadcasts over several years. The trio was another area in which his skills at arrangement were frequently employed. He interrupted his studies and served some years as oboist for J. C. Williamson theatres, playing musicals, opera, and several Gilbert and Sullivan Opera seasons, several ballet seasons (Borovansky Ballet), Australian tours of the Royal Covent Garden Ballet, and the American Ballet Company, and as a copyist / arranger with GTV channel 9. In 1961 Ian Harris moved to Hobart, Tasmania (Tasmanian Symphony Orchestra), was seconded to the Sydney Symphony Orchestra (cor anglais) for several months, returned to Tasmania only to be seconded again 1964, this time to the Victorian Symphony Orchestra (oboe). Back again in Tasmania, his next move was to Wellington, New Zealand (1965–1974) to join NZBCSO (the New Zealand Broadcasting Corporation Symphony Orchestra) as Principal Cor anglais. During this time, in which he yo-yoed across Australasia, Harris tutored in oboe at the universities of Tasmania, Melbourne, and the Victoria University of Wellington. It was at the latter that he completed his degree in composition (with David Farquhar) in 1969. He was to return yet again to Tasmania at the end of 1974. However, this time, he embraced a new career as a music educator with his move. He also conducted the Tasmanian Junior Youth Orchestra for several years.

Harris was a dedicated member of policy committees, especially in Education and the Arts and served as music critic for The Mercury, Hobart's daily newspaper, for several years.

Ian Harris moved back to Sydney definitively in 2000 and has since devoted himself to composition.

Works
Harris destroyed most of his early compositions on completion, "never satisfied in their worth".

His oeuvre consists mainly of chamber music, much of which has been performed and broadcast: Microsymphony for Cor anglais Quartet (cor anglais, string trio), Oboe Quartet (oboe, string trio), Essay for Bassoon and Strings, Sonata for Viola and Piano, amongst many other pieces and numerous arrangements for broadcasts and concerts.

His sense of fun has shown in many of his compositions including, A Piece with Strawberry Jam, The Little Dog's Day (Rupert Brooke), Paw de trois, a Pas de trois for an Imaginary Canine Ballet (for Wind Quintet, with movements dedicated to his dogs by name), The Whitebait Fishers  "A sort of Donizetti-like spoof for harpsichord, string quartet and small choir, for which the producer of the hour-long national radio show penned the libretto for this, a special anniversary broadcast of the programme."

Harris orchestrated songs for symphony concerts, including a version of The Last Rose of Summer for Rita Streich (1920–1987). He also wrote, directed and even performed in advertising jingles, playing celesta, oboe, cor anglais or whatever was required.

References

External links
 

1936 births
20th-century classical composers
21st-century classical composers
Australian classical composers
Australian male classical composers
Australian music arrangers
Living people
New Zealand Symphony Orchestra people
20th-century Australian male musicians
20th-century Australian musicians
21st-century Australian male musicians
21st-century Australian musicians